Achagua, or Achawa, is an Arawakan language spoken in the Meta Department of Colombia, similar to Piapoco. It is estimated that 250 individuals speak the language, many of whom also speak Piapoco or Spanish.

"Achagua is a language of the Maipurean Arawakan group traditionally spoken by the Achagua people of Venezuela and east-central Colombia."

A "Ponares" language is inferred from surnames, and may have been Achawa or Piapoco.

There is 1 to 5% literacy in Achagua.

Phonology

Consonants 

 /n/ is realized as  when preceding palatal consonants.
 /k/ is palatalized  when preceding /i/.
 Sounds /b, d/ are preglottalized  within accented syllables or after accented syllables.
 /b/ is realized as  when occurring intervocalically.
 /w/ is realized as  when preceding /i/.
 /s̪/ is realized as  when preceding /i/.
 /ʝ/ is heard as an affricate  in word-initial positions. It can also be realized as a glide  freely in intervocalic positions.
 /ɭ/ can be heard as a flap  in free variation before /i/.

Vowels

Notes

External links
 
 
 OLAC resources in and about the Achagua language
 Achagua on Native Languages of the Americas
 Listen to a sample of Achagua from Global Recordings Network
The Archive of Indigenous Languages of Latin America https://www.ailla.utexas.org/islandora/search/Achagua?type=dismax

Languages of Colombia
Arawakan languages